Bjørn Hernæs (born 23 November 1936 in Sør-Odal) is a Norwegian politician for the Conservative Party.

He was elected to the Norwegian Parliament from Hedmark in 1993, and was re-elected on two occasions.

Hernæs was a deputy member of Sør-Odal municipality council during the term 1995–1999.

References

1936 births
Living people
Conservative Party (Norway) politicians
Members of the Storting
21st-century Norwegian politicians
20th-century Norwegian politicians
People from Sør-Odal